Dicerca is a genus of beetles in the family Buprestidae. It contains the following species:

References

Buprestidae genera
Taxa named by Johann Friedrich von Eschscholtz